{{DISPLAYTITLE:NZR AB class}}

The NZR AB class was a class of 4-6-2 Pacific tender steam locomotive that operated on New Zealand's national railway system for New Zealand Railways (NZR). Originally an improvement on the 1906 A class, 141 were built between 1915 and 1927 by NZR's Addington Workshops, A & G Price of Thames, New Zealand, and North British Locomotive Company, making the AB class the largest class of steam locomotives ever to run in New Zealand. An additional eleven were rebuilt from the tank version of the AB – the WAB class – between 1947 and 1957. Two North British-made locomotives were lost in the wreck of the SS Wiltshire in May 1922.

Construction and design 
The genesis of the AB class originated from the construction of A class 4-6-2 No. 409 at Addington Railway Workshops in 1906. A two-cylinder simple-expansion locomotive, 409 was initially classified AB to differentiate it from the four-cylinder compound A and AD class locomotives, which were by and large of a similar design although built as compounds. AB 409 was, in reality, the experimental locomotive for what would become the most prolific type on the New Zealand Railways network, with construction beginning on a new prototype 4-6-2 in 1915.

The new locomotive, AB 608, was to a completely different design from AB 409 when it emerged from the Addington Workshops in 1915. Although largely similar to the A class, it had a new design of cab and boiler, which was fitted with a superheater after trials conducted on AB 409. It also had the distinctive Vanderbilt tender, which would become a hallmark of the AB class during its working life. This locomotive was to become the first of 141 similar locomotives built by various builders in New Zealand and the United Kingdom for NZR.

Introduction 
The AB class compared more favourably in service against the compound A class. Reputedly the first engine able to generate one horsepower for every 100 pounds of weight (16.4 W/kg), the AB class was efficient and versatile, and the engines were easy to maintain and operate. However, it became clear that there were several shortcomings of the design – notably the cab was too small, and the tenders were not sturdy enough. A new and longer cab was fitted to all new locomotives being built from that time onwards, with the first appearing on AB 663. New tender structures were also built at a later date.

The locomotives were extremely versatile, and the AB class were used on almost every section of the NZR network, the exception being the Nelson Section (closed 1955). In later years, the class were displaced from their mainline duties first by the larger J and K series locomotives, and later by the arrival of diesel locomotives (DA and DG classes in the North Island, DH and DJ classes in the South Island). As a result of the arrival of new diesel locomotives in the North Island from 1955 onwards, many of the North Island-based locomotives were transferred to the South Island to see out their remaining working lives.

The final duties of the AB class were on branch line workings, where they found their niche after being displaced from most mainline duties by larger locomotives. These in turn displaced the A and Q class 4-6-2 locomotives from their duties, resulting in the withdrawal of all Q class locomotives by 1957 and a reduction in the number of A class locomotives. The locomotives also worked some lesser mainline duties, and others, such as those at Gisborne, were used as bankers to assist trains heading south to Napier.

Being highly capable, the AB class were used for both freight and passenger trains. Along with the earlier F class, they were known as the "Maids for all work". Their work on express passenger trains was diminished by the arrival of the J class of 1939,  and K class of 1932 tender locomotives in the 1930s, and also with the introduction of the heavier steel-panelled carriages built from 1930 until 1943. Despite being displaced, the AB class could still be found at work on relief expresses during holiday periods.

The locomotives did not change greatly during their NZR career. The first change was to fit Waikato-type spark arrestors to many of the North Island-based engines, resulting in a new 'pear-shaped' smokebox with an ash hopper at the base of the smokebox. The cast-iron smokebox doors were replaced by steel ones, and the brake pump was moved from its original location on the right-hand side of the smokebox to a new position, recessed into the running board, just forward of the cab on the same side.

Another notable change was that many of the class were fitted with ballast blocks for mechanical purposes. As the locomotives rode well, this was not to prevent derailments as with the Q class 4-6-2s of 1901. Furthermore, certain engines were not fitted with ballast blocks, so their inclusion is questionable. Other cosmetic changes included fitting a large Pyle National electric headlight on top of the smokebox and replacement of the copper-capped funnels with the standard NZR "flowerpot" type.

Components

Boilers
The AB type boiler had a working pressure of 180psi, a standard across the type. These boilers were of standard construction, no matter which firm built them, and as such were interchangeable across any locomotives of the type. They were also similar to the boilers built for the WAB and WS class 4-6-4T tank locomotives in 1939 - in fact, the WAB boiler and AB boilers were the same, with those fitted to the WAB fitted with the necessary components to draw water from the locomotive's side tanks.

This type of boiler was also adapted for use on the Q and AA class 4-6-2 tender locomotives of 1901 and 1915 respectively when their original boilers wore out. In the case of the AA class, the boiler change was not necessitated by the condition of the boilers but due to the limitations of the original boilers. The replacement took place in the 1930s, and these locomotives gained new heights of reliability, before they were withdrawn in 1957 (at the same time as the Q class). All of these boilers were then put back into the AB class pool, and were reused on engines of that class.

In all, 6 separate classes used the standard AB boiler. When Q, AA and G class locomotives were scrapped in the 1950s, the boilers were overhauled to keep locomotives of A, AB, and WAB serviceable.

Tenders
Throughout their NZR careers, the AB class were known for their Vanderbilt tenders - one of three classes to use this tender, the others being the re-built G class 4-6-2, and the later J/Ja/Jb class 4-8-2 engines. The tenders, although satisfactory, suffered from having been constructed too lightly for the intended task, and were also prone to rusting, particularly around the frame channels. This necessitated the complete replacement of the tender frames from some locomotives, although not all were treated so.

The standard AB tender design was adapted for the three-cylinder G class locomotive 4-6-2 tender locomotive rebuilds of 1937. These tenders had a more substantial tender underframe and was also unique in that the body was of welded construction rather than the traditional riveted style. As such, they became known as the 'G' style tender. When the six locomotives were withdrawn in 1956, their tenders were fitted to AB class locomotives.

Further G type tenders were constructed later on by Addington Railway Workshops (Christchurch) and Otahuhu Workshops (Auckland) for AB class locomotives whose tenders were not considered to be economically repairable. However, this was not always the case:
 AB 688 received a 'G' type tender to replace its original tender, which was wrecked in the Blind River derailment of 25 February 1948. This accident was attributed to the lack of a reliable speedometer on the locomotive, causing relief driver Jim Gurr to misjudge his speed.
 AB 743 received a 'G' type tender after it was derailed by a 7.1 magnitude earthquake centred near Inangahua Junction on 24 May 1968. The locomotive was hauling a goods train from Greymouth to Westport when the earthquake struck, causing the locomotive's tender to fall onto its side. The damaged tender was written off, and a new 'G' type tender was constructed to replace it.

With 141 members of this type in New Zealand, tenders were inevitably swapped with other locomotives. For example, a locomotive undergoing overhaul might lose its good-condition tender to another with a poor-condition tender to speed up the process of out shopping the second locomotive. All tenders of the type were numbered; the number was made out of weld and was positioned just below the tender headlight bracket.

The tenders initially rode on drawing x-6002 standard bogies fitted with grease-lubricated bearings. Later, drawing x-10161 bogies, still fitted with grease-lubricated bearings were substituted on some locomotives as they came in for an overhaul. A later variant was the drawing x-11183 'Timken' roller-bearing bogie fitted to the WAB class conversions of 1947-57 and as used under the G class locomotive tenders from 1937. Enthusiasts were able to identify these different types of bogies by their design characteristics - for example, the x-6002 bogies had a prominent journal box and were made of steel bar sections.

Frame replacement 
During the late 1950s to early 1960s, many older AB class locomotives were being withdrawn as they wore out and were replaced by locomotives displaced from other regions. With many engines still in relatively good condition, these engines were cannibalised following withdrawal to keep other engines going until they were either worn out or replaced by the new diesel locomotives then being purchased by NZR. This became a fairly common practice at the time; as the locomotives were of a standard design, parts could be taken from any engine to ensure another could keep running for some time to come.

One example of this was AB 792, one of the ten WAB class conversions from 1947 to 1957. Shopped for an 'A' grade overhaul at Hillside Workshops, the locomotive had a cracked mainframe but was otherwise in mechanically good condition. It was decided to use part of the good-condition frames from under AB 661, then recently withdrawn, to replace the damaged section from 792. The locomotive's frame was then altered by cutting the affected section out and fitting the new frame section, ex-661.

This meant that certain locomotives should have changed identity - the identity of the locomotive is attached (supposedly) to the frame of the locomotive. Therefore, AB 792 should have become AB 661 as a result of the frame repairs. However, with 661 written off and 792 being a younger locomotive that still had an economic career ahead, the NZR would not have considered 'returning' 661 to service and 'scrapping' 792.

Withdrawal 
The majority of the class was withdrawn from NZR services during the 1960s, as diesel traction replaced steam, with the last concentrations of the AB class being located on the West Coast and in Southland. Many of those withdrawn were South Island locomotives which had reached the end of their economic lives between 1963 and 1967 (when the DJ class diesels arrived) and were replaced by ex-North Island locomotives. By 1971, several still remained on the books at the close of steam operations on the NZR.

Three remained on NZR books in 1972 - AB's 778 and 795 remained at Lyttelton to heat the carriages for the "Boat Train", formerly known in an informal manner as the "Jackaroo", while AB 663 remained either at Greymouth's Elmer Lane locomotive depot or at Dunedin. With interest for a nostalgic steam-operated train growing, both 778 and 795 were restored that same year for the famous Kingston Flyer. AB 663 was used initially at Dunedin for spare parts to keep 778 and 795, now named David McKellar and Greenvale respectively.

Names 
AB 608 gained the notable distinction of being named Passchendaele in 1918 to commemorate the NZR staff who had been killed in the First World War. The locomotive had its nameplates removed in the 1940s, and they were placed on display in the Christchurch and Dunedin railway stations. Two replicas were made in 1963 for the NZR centenary event, and these are held by the New Zealand Railway & Locomotive Society. Other reproductions have been made, including one for the KiwiRail War Memorial at Hutt Workshops, which was dedicated in 2010. This was the only steam locomotive to be named after 1877.

AB 663 was named Sharon Lee when it was restored to running condition in 1997. The locomotive is named after Sharon Lee Welch, daughter of Mainline Steam Trust principle Ian Welch.

AB 778 and AB 795 were named David McKellar (778) and Greenvale (795) respectively by NZR in 1971 when they were overhauled for the Kingston Flyer heritage train between Lumsden and Kingston. The track now only runs between Kingston and Fairlight.

Preservation 
Seven AB class locomotives have been preserved:
 AB 608 Passchendaele was donated by NZR to the New Zealand Railway and Locomotive Society in 1967 as the class leader of the AB class. It was towed to Ferrymead in 1972 and remained there until 1993 when Steam Incorporated of Paekakariki indicated an interest in leasing and restoring 608. It was towed to Wellington as part of a Steam Inc excursion in 1993, and work began to restore the locomotive in 1997 with the stripping of the engine unit for restoration. The locomotive has since received a new tender body, and been fitted with stronger 'Janney yoke' drawgear to facilitate towing of the locomotive by mainline freight train if necessary. AB 608 was recommissioned on 25 April 2014 and is now operational and mainline certified.
 AB 663 Sharon Lee was used as the spare parts source for the Kingston Flyer until purchased by Ian Welch of the Mainline Steam Heritage Trust in 1983. It was returned to service in 1997 with a tender formerly with AB 811 which had been scrapped. It has been named Sharon Lee after one of Ian Welch's daughters and is notable in having its headlight mounted on the front of the smokebox (not the top as was correct) and having been converted to burn oil instead of coal making it the first oil-fired pacific.
Purchased for static display at Pleasant Point station, it arrived on 5 November 1970. It was later restored to operating condition, first steaming in 1974 and has been a popular attraction at the railway ever since.
 AB 745 was derailed by embankment subsidence at Hāwera in 1956. Rather than recover the locomotive, NZR salvaged all parts from the right-hand (driver's) side of the locomotive, and buried it along with several V series insulated meat vans. The engine unit of 745 was dug out of the embankment in 2001. As of September 2012, AB 745 was owned by The Taranaki Flyer Society Inc., and they were restoring the locomotive in the former railway goods shed in Stratford, Taranaki, New Zealand. It is now owned by the Rimutaka Incline Railway Heritage Trust after the Taranaki Flyer Society Inc.'s leased building was vacated at the end of 2013. AB will be a long-term restoration project by the railway.
 AB 778 is owned by the Kingston Flyer. Named David McKellar. It is currently out of service requiring a boiler overhaul.
 AB 795, converted from a WAB class 4-6-4T tank locomotive in the period 1947–57, is owned by the Kingston Flyer. Named Greenvale. It is maintained in operational condition but is currently stored.
 AB 832, the last steam locomotive to work in the North Island when steam ended there in 1967, was donated by NZR to the Museum of Transport and Technology. Stored pending restoration at MOTAT 2. It was on long-term lease to the Glenbrook Vintage Railway and was stored at the GVR's Pukeoware depot until August 2018.

Similar locomotives 
The WAB class of 1917 was essentially a tank locomotive version of the AB class.

Gallery

See also
 NZR Q class (1901)
 NZR A/AD class (1906)
 NZR AA class
 NZR G class (1928)
 Locomotives of New Zealand

References

Citations

Bibliography

External links
Brian's place - a tribute to the AB class
NZR Steam locomotives - Ab class
Official website of the Kingston Flyer
Official website of the Pleasant Point Museum and Railway
Official website of The Taranaki Flyer Society Inc.

Ab class
4-6-2 locomotives
NBL locomotives
3 ft 6 in gauge locomotives of New Zealand
Railway locomotives introduced in 1915